Nuno Alexandre Teixeira Sociedade (born 6 January 1979) is a Portuguese footballer who plays for Santiago Futebol Clube mainly as a left midfielder.

Club career
Sociedade was born in Ponta Delgada. Being able to operate as either a midfielder or a defender on the left flank, he spent most of his professional career with local C.D. Santa Clara, playing nearly 200 competitive matches with the Azores club and also being eventually awarded captaincy. His only Primeira Liga experience arrived in the 2002–03 season, but he failed to appear in the league – only six presences as an unused substitute – as the side were also relegated after ranking in 16th position.

In the summer of 2010, after just four second division games during the campaign, the 31-year-old Sociedade left Santa Clara and signed for Santiago Futebol Clube, an amateur team in the island of São Miguel, in his birth region.

References

External links

1979 births
Living people
People from Ponta Delgada
Portuguese footballers
Association football midfielders
Liga Portugal 2 players
CU Micaelense players
C.D. Santa Clara players